The Žemaitijos Taurė is an annual pre-season football tournament between teams from Samogitia. It is organized by the Telšiai County Football Federation and takes place in early March at the Telšiai Artificial Football Pitch in Telšiai, Lithuania.

History
The origins of the tournament seeks Samogitian Championship, which was started in mid 1930s, with Džiugas winning first three tournaments of 1935, 1936, 1937. The first modern Samogitia Cup was organised by Telšiai County Football Federation in 2015 to mark the 80 years from the birth of original tournament. It's hosted by Džiugas and held on 8–21 March as simple round-robin tournament. Šilutė won the inaugural tournament after defeating Džiugas 2–1 in the last round.

The format for later editions was changed a little bit as additional games for 1st, 3rd and 5th places were added after the group competitions. The amount of participating teams has also been expanded from 8 to 10 participants. Banga won the second edition of the cup. Hosts Džiugas finally became champions in 2017 tournament. Pakruojis occurred as the fourth different winner in 2018 beating hosts Džiugas by a goal difference in the overall table as rules of the tournament were reverted to the first year format due to a decline in participating teams number.

Competition was discontinued in 2019, though an U-17 tournament was organized instead.

Winners

Performance by team
Žemaitijos Taurė hosts Džiugas are the only team that have participated in all four tournaments. Together with Palanga and Minija, they make the only three clubs that have finished as medalists throughout every appearance in the competitions.

References

Lithuanian football friendly trophies
Sport in Telšiai
FC Džiugas Telšiai
2015 establishments in Lithuania
Recurring sporting events established in 2015